Potamosilurus macrorhynchus, the sharp-nose catfish, is a species of sea catfish endemic to the island of New Guinea where it is found in both Papua New Guinea and in West Papua, the Indonesian part of the island. It is a strictly fresh water catfish and grows to a length of 50 cm.

References
 
 http://www.fishwisepro.com/Species/details.aspx?SId=40265&Zoom=True

Ariidae
Taxa named by Max Carl Wilhelm Weber
Freshwater fish of Papua New Guinea
Freshwater fish of Western New Guinea
Fish described in 1913